(anglicized Gardariki or Gardarike) or  was the Old Norse term used in the Middle Ages for the Kievan Rus' state.

Etymology
The word , which first appeared in Icelandic sagas in the twelfth century, could stem from the words  and  according to the common Scandinavian pattern for state formations X+ríki, therefore this term could be translated into English as "the kingdom of Garðar". The name  itself was used in skaldic poems, runic inscriptions and early sagas up to the twelfth century to refer to the lands to the east of Scandinavia populated by the Rus' people.

 is a plural form of the Old Norse word  which referred to 1) a fence; 2) a fortification; 3) a yard; 4) a court; 5) a farm; 6) a village house, while the related Old Russian word  referred to 1) a fence; 2) a fortification; 3) a field defensive work; 4) a settlement. Since there is an overlapping meaning among the ones these related words once had ("a fence, a fortified place"), both garðr and городъ could mean the same at one time in the past. Thus, some researches interpreted  as a collective name for Old Rus' towns encountered by Scandinavians on their way from Lyubsha and Ladoga down the Volkhov River into other Slavonic lands. These fortified towns had to assert themselves especially against the Khazar Khaganate until the end of the 9th century and therefore they developed the first East Slavic state currently designated as Kievan Rus'. In this way, the younger toponym  could mean "the realm of towns", or "the country of towns".

Legendary kings 
 
 
  (king from)

Literature 
 Brandt, Dagmar:  (novel). 2 Volumes, Berlin 1943. Reprint .
 Jakobsson, Sverrir, The Varangians: In God’s Holy Fire (Palgrave Macmillan, 2020),

See also 
 Rus' Khaganate

Notes

Citations

References 

 
 
 
 
 
 
 
 
 
 
 
 
 
 
 
 

History of Kievan Rus'
Viking Age populated places
Exonyms
Saga locations
Old Norse